Chittagonian ( saṭgãia or  siʈaiŋga) is an Indo-Aryan language spoken in parts of the Chittagong Division in Bangladesh. Its speakers identify with Bengali culture and the Bengali language, but Chittagonian and Bengali are not mutually intelligible. Chittagonian is considered to be a separate language by many linguists. It is mutually intelligible with Rohingya and to a lesser extent with Noakhailla. It is estimated (2009) that Chittagonian has 13 million speakers, principally in Bangladesh.

Classification
Chittagonian is a member of the Bengali-Assamese sub-branch of the Eastern group of Indo-Aryan languages, a branch of the wider Indo-European language family. It is derived through an Eastern Middle Indo-Aryan from Old Indo-Aryan, and ultimately from Proto-Indo-European.  grouped the dialects of Chittagong under Southeastern Bengali, alongside the dialects of Noakhali and Akyab.  places Chittagonian in the eastern Vangiya group of Magadhi Prakrit and notes that all Bengali dialects were independent of each other and did not emanate from the literary Bengali called "sadhu bhasha". Among the different dialect groups of these eastern dialects, Chittagonian has phonetic and morphological properties that are not present in standard Bengali and other western dialects of Bengali.

Phonology

Consonants 

 Approximants  are only heard as allophones of vowels .

Vowels 

 Nasalization occurs for seven vowels .

Writing system
The Arabic script has historically been used to write this language.

The Bengali script (Bangla Lipi) and Latin script are used to write this language. 

Gboard for Android has added Chittagongian Keyboard.

See also
 Chittagong
 Rohingya language
 Chittagong Division
 Chittagong Hill Tracts

Bibliography

References

External links

Languages of Bangladesh
Eastern Indo-Aryan languages
Subject–object–verb languages
Articles citing Nationalencyklopedin
Chittagong District
Bengali dialects